The Australian Foreign Investment Review Board (FIRB), "examines proposals by foreign persons to invest in Australia and makes recommendations to the Treasurer on those subject to the Foreign Acquisitions and Takeovers Act 1975 and Australia's foreign investment policy. The FIRB is independent but is assisted by the executive to the treasury."

Their functions include:
Evaluating foreign investment proposals
Pushing Australian equity participation in new investors who want to invest in Australia
Monitor foreign-controlled businesses in Australia
Review and approval of the purchase of property in Australia by non-residents
Liaise with state and local governments

References

Commonwealth Government agencies of Australia
Investment in Australia
Government agencies established in 1976
1976 establishments in Australia